Epomis croesus is a species of ground beetle. It is found in Mali.

References 

Licininae
Beetles of Africa
Beetles described in 1801